The 2016 season was Malmö FF's 105th in existence, their 81st season in Allsvenskan and their 16th consecutive season in the league. They competed in Allsvenskan where they finished first, the 2015–16 Svenska Cupen where they finished as runners-up, and the 2016–17 Svenska Cupen where they were knocked out in round two. The season began with the group stage of Svenska Cupen on 20 February, league play started on 2 April and the season concluded with the last league match on 6 November.

The club appointed Allan Kuhn as new head coach on 8 January after Åge Hareide left to coach the Denmark national football team. Despite winning the league title in his first season, Kuhn was sacked by the club on 19 November. For the first time since the 2012 season, Malmö FF only competed in domestic competitions after failing to qualify for Europe in the previous season. On the domestic stage, Malmö FF won their 19th Swedish championship after winning the league title again after a one-year wait. The club also reached their first Svenska Cupen final since 1996 but ultimately finished as runners-up after losing on penalties to BK Häcken, having been 2–0 up at half-time. For the first time since the cup changed format, Malmö FF failed to qualify for next season's group-stage after losing to tier three club Landskrona BoIS in the second round of qualifications.

Players

Squad

Players in/out

In

Out

Competitions

Overall

Allsvenskan

League table

Results summary

Results by round

Matches

Non-competitive

Pre-season
Kickoff times are in UTC+1 unless stated otherwise.

Mid-season
Kickoff times are in UTC+2 unless stated otherwise.

Footnotes

External links
  

Malmö FF seasons
Malmö FF
Swedish football championship-winning seasons